Charles Osmond (1859 – 20 October 1937) was a New Zealand cricketer. He played two first-class matches for Auckland in 1884/85.

See also
 List of Auckland representative cricketers

References

External links
 

1859 births
1937 deaths
New Zealand cricketers
Auckland cricketers
Cricketers from Devon